Lake Arrowhead  is located approximately two miles (3 km) southwest of Waleska, in the mountainous, west-northwestern part of Cherokee County, Georgia, United States.

Gated community
In addition to the actual lake, "Lake Arrowhead" also refers to the lake's surrounding, gated community. The community's property was bought in the 1960s and established in the early 1970s as a remote mountain retreat, but now finds itself at the edge of metro Atlanta's exurban expansion.  The small valley Lake Arrowhead sits in and the surrounding community was originally known by local residents as "Lost Town," which was initially settled in the 1840s.  Many descendants of the first pioneers still live nearby in the Waleska area.

The private, Lake Arrowhead community consists of two lakes, Lake Arrowhead and Lake Chickasaw, has two security gates, an 18-hole golf course, a clubhouse, boat rentals, a marina, nature trails, a chapel, a community swimming pool, tennis courts and one volunteer fire department; one fulltime fire department.   Additionally, the community includes condominium homes, some of which are located on the golf course, and a small, historic cemetery, which consists mostly of graves from the Puckett family, early Lost Town settlers.

Schools
Local, elementary-aged school (kindergarten through sixth grade) children attend R.M. Moore Elementary School in Waleska, while students in seventh grade and eighth grades go to Teasley Middle School in Canton. All high-schoolers (9th to 12th grade) are assigned to Cherokee High School, which is also in Canton. Reinhardt University, a private liberal arts university established in 1883, is located in Waleska.

See also

References

External links

Lake Arrowhead Lifestyle
Lake Arrowhead Waleska
 https://web.archive.org/web/20110904153503/http://www.atlantarealestateforum.com/profiles/community-profiles/lake-arrowhead/

Bodies of water of Cherokee County, Georgia
Populated places in Cherokee County, Georgia
Arrowhead
Unincorporated communities in Georgia (U.S. state)
Waleska, Georgia